The 2017–18 Togolese Championnat National season is the 48th edition (since independence) of the top level of football competition in Togo. It began on 18 November 2017 and ended on 30 June 2018.

Standings
Final table.

See also
2018 Coupe du Togo

References

Football leagues in Togo
Championnat National
Championnat National
Togo